Diauehi (Georgian დიაოხი, Urartian Diauehi, Greek Taochoi, Armenian Tayk, possibly Assyrian Daiaeni,) was a tribal union located in northeastern Anatolia, that was recorded in Assyrian and Urartian sources during the Iron Age. It is usually (though not always) identified with the earlier Daiaeni (Dayaeni), attested in the Yonjalu inscription of the Assyrian king Tiglath-Pileser I's third year (1118 BC) and in later records by Shalmaneser III (845 BC). While it is unknown what language(s) they spoke, they may have been speakers of a Kartvelian, Armenian, or Hurrian language.

Location

Although the exact geographic extent of Diauehi is still unclear, many scholars place it in the Pasinler Plain in today's northeastern Turkey, while others locate it in the Armenian–Georgian marchlands as it follows the Kura River. Most probably, the core of the Diauehi lands may have extended from the headwaters of the Euphrates into the river valleys of Çoruh to Oltu. The Urartian sources speak of Diauehi's three key cities—Zua, Utu and Sasilu; Zua is frequently identified with Zivin Kale and Utu is probably modern Oltu, while Sasilu is sometimes linked to the early medieval Georgian toponym Sasire, near Tortomi (present-day Tortum, Turkey). 
The Diaeuhian city Šešetina may have corresponded to Şavşat, Turkey (Shavsheti in Georgian).

The region of Diauehi seems to have roughly corresponded to, or bordered, the previous Hayasa-Azzi territory.

History
In the early 8th century, Diauehi became the target of the newly emerged regional power of Urartu. Menua (810–785 BC) conquered part of Diaeuhi, annexing its most important cities: Zua, Utu, and Shashilu, and forcing the king of Diauehi, Utupursi(ni), to pay a tribute of gold and silver.

Menua's son, Argishti I (785–763 BC), campaigned against the Diauehi kingdom in 783. Argishti I defeated King Utupursi, annexing his possessions․ In exchange for his life, Utupursi was forced to pay a tribute including a variety of metals and livestock. Toward the end of his reign, Argishti I led yet another campaign against Utuspursi, who led a rebellion against the Urartians.

Possible ethno-linguistic identification

Diauehi is considered by some as a locus of Proto-Kartvelian; it has been described as an "important tribal formation of possible proto-Georgians" by Ronald Grigor Suny (1994).

According to Robert H. Hewsen, they may have been speakers of a language unrelated to any other in the Caucasus region.

However, they are mentioned by Diodorus Siculus as Xaoi, which Hewsen etymologizes as a Greek form of the Armenian endonym, Hayk'.

Massimo Forlanini proposed a connection between the name of the Diaeuhi tribe, Baltu, and the Hayasan deity, Baltaik. He also compared these to the name of the Hayasan mercenary, Waltahi.

Connection to Daiaeni (Dayaeni)

Some scholars have linked the Diaeuhi to the Bronze Age Daiaeni (Dayaeni) tribe, mentioned in 12th century BC Assyrian sources as being part of the Nairi confederation. This connection is mainly due to the phonetic similarities of the names Daiaeni and Diaeuhi.

The Daiaeni were powerful enough to counter the Assyrian forays, although in 1112 BC their king, Sien, was defeated by Tiglath-Pileser I. Sien was captured and later released on terms of vassalage.

Daiaeni appeared again in Assyrian texts nearly three centuries later when King Asia of Daiaeni (850–825 BC) was forced to submit to the Assyrian king Shalmaneser III in 845 BC, after the latter had overrun Urartu and made a foray into Daiaeni.

As the Daiaeni of Assyrian records seem to have been located further south than the Diaeuhi of Urartian records, Robert H. Hewsen and Nicholas Adontz proposed that the Diaieni originally inhabited a region between Palu and either Mush Province or Lake Van. They then moved north to Kars Province, where they battled the Urartians and later encountered Greek mercenaries, including Xenophon. They subsequently moved further northwest.

Archibald Sayce suggested that Daiaeni was named after an eponymous founder, Diaus, and thus meant "people of the land/tribe of Diau(s)".

Onomastics

Daiaeni rulers

Diau(s) (possible founder/patriarch suggested by Archibald Sayce)

Sien

Asia

Diauehi rulers
Utupursi(ni)

Diauehi Tribes
Ardaraki

Baltu

Kabili

Šaški

Diauehi Districts
Kada

Ašqalaši

Diauehi Cities
Šašilu

Utuha

Zua

Ḫaldiriluḫi

See also
List of ancient kingdoms of Anatolia
Urartu
Nairi
Hayasa-Azzi
Colchis

References

Explanatory notes

Further reading 
Antonio Sagona, Claudia Sagona, Archaeology At The North-east Anatolian Frontier, I: An Historical Geography And A Field Survey of the Bayburt Province (Ancient Near Eastern Studies) (Hardcover), Peeters (January 30, 2005), 
Georgia. (2006). Encyclopædia Britannica. Retrieved February 14, 2006, from Encyclopædia Britannica Premium Service
Kavtaradze, G. L., "An Attempt to Interpret Some Anatolian and Caucasian Ethnonyms of the Classical Sources", Sprache und Kultur, # 3 (Staatliche Ilia Tschawtschawadse Universitaet Tbilisi für Sprache und Kultur Institut zur Erforschung des westlichen Denkens). Tbilisi, 2002. G. L. Kavtaradze. An Attempt to Interpret Some Anatolian and Caucasian Ethnonyms of the Classical Sources | Anatolia | Hittites
Melikishvili, G. A., "Diauehi". The Bulletin of Ancient History, vol. 4, 1950. (Publication in Russian)
 С. Д. Гоготидзе, Локализация «стран» Даиаэн-Диаоха.

 
Ancient peoples of Georgia (country)
Iron Age Anatolia
Urartu
Former kingdoms